Warrant officer schools of the Russian Armed Forces conduct warrant officer training programmes. Education acquired at such schools is vocational military education (level 4 according to the International Standard Classification of Education). The duration of studies is 2 years and 6–10 months.

Graduates of these schools are granted the military rank of praporshchik/michman.

History
Warrant officers schools were established by Minister of Defence Order of 20 December 1980 No.365. Only enlisted personnel and non-commissioned officers, finished their military service as conscripts, could be accepted to enter warrant officers schools. The period of training was ten and half months.

The Minister of Defence Order of 20 December 1980 No.365 was replaced by the Minister of Defence Order of 27 December 2004 No.452. Only volunteer enlisted personnel and non-commissioned officers could be accepted to enter warrant officers schools.

All warrant officers schools ceased their educational activity in the framework of the Serdyukov reform. In 2013, new Minister of Defence Sergei Shoigu decided to restore the institution of warrant officers. New staff complement, which included warrant officers positions, was approved in July of the same year. Warrant officers training began to be carried out by special educational divisions within the structure of higher military schools and academies. The duration of studies extended to 2 years and 6–10 months. The admission became available not only for active duty enlisted personnel and non-commissioned officers (volunteers and conscripts) but also for civilians graduated from secondary schools.

List of Russian military educational institutions conducting warrant officer training programmes

General-purpose warrant officer schools
 Krasnodar Higher Military School named for Army General S.M. Shtemenko
 Military Institute of Physical Culture
 Military University of Radioelectronics

Warrant officer schools of the Ground Forces
 Budyonny Military Academy of the Signal Corps
 Far Eastern Higher Combined Arms Command School
 Mikhailovskaya Military Artillery Academy
 Military Academy of Field Anti-Aircraft Defense
 Military Logistics Academy
 NBC Protection Military Academy
 Tyumen Higher Military Engineer Command School named after A.I. Proshlyakov

Warrant officer schools of the Navy
 Kuznetsov Naval Academy
 Nakhimov Higher Naval School
 Pacific Higher Naval School

Warrant officer schools of the Aerospace Forces
 A.F. Mozhaysky Military-Space Academy

Warrant officer schools of the Airborne Forces
 Ryazan Guards Higher Airborne Command School

References

External links
 List of Russian military educational institutions

Military education and training in Russia
Non-commissioned officers